Iniistius dea, the blackspot razorfish, is a species of marine ray-finned fish 
from the family Labridae, the wrasses. It is found in the Indo-West Pacific, from India and northwestern Australia to the southern part of Japan and into the China seas.  

References

dea
Taxa named by Coenraad Jacob Temminck
Taxa named by Hermann Schlegel
Fish described in 1845